Iren Opdahl (born 19 October 1974) is a Norwegian politician for the Liberal Party.

She served as a deputy representative to the Parliament of Norway from Nord-Trøndelag during the term 2013–2017. She hails from Steinkjer.

References

1974 births
Living people
People from Steinkjer
Deputy members of the Storting
Liberal Party (Norway) politicians
Politicians from Nord-Trøndelag
Women members of the Storting
21st-century Norwegian women politicians
21st-century Norwegian politicians